Stephen Thompson (born August 1, 1972) is an online music journalist for NPR and editor of several music-related columns for NPR Music, including "Song Of The Day" and "Shadow Classics". He is a regular on the NPR podcasts Pop Culture Happy Hour and All Songs Considered and also serves as an occasional guest music commentator for Morning Edition. He created NPR Music video series Tiny Desk Concerts with Bob Boilen in 2008.

Biography 
The son of editors Don and Maggie Thompson, Thompson is a 1994 graduate of the University of Wisconsin–Madison, where he helped found student-run radio station WSUM. He joined The Onion as an entertainment writer in November 1992. In the summer of 1993, he founded and became editor of the paper’s entertainment section, which was dubbed The A.V. Club in 1995. By the time Thompson left The Onion in December 2004, the section had spawned its own website and book, The Tenacity Of The Cockroach: Conversations With Entertainment's Most Enduring Outsiders, which he edited. In addition, Thompson served as copy editor for The Onion’s comedy section and first six humor books, from 1999's #1 New York Times best-seller Our Dumb Century through 2004's The Onion Ad Nauseam, Vol. 15.
When Lady Gaga allegedly refused to allow "Weird Al" Yankovic to parody her single "Born This Way," Thompson broke the news that it was Gaga's manager who had denied the request without her knowledge. Once brought to her attention, Lady Gaga approved Yankovic's parody.

A Green Bay Packers fan, Thompson saw his love for the team manifest in a 22-minute documentary released by the team in 2017, as part of its Packers Life series. 

As a freelance entertainment and humor writer, Thompson has been published in Paste magazine, The Washington Post, The Guardian, and McSweeney’s. In 1999, he also co-founded The Onion’s softball team, the haplessness of which he chronicled in loving but often grisly detail at www.teamonion.com. Thompson lives in Silver Spring, Maryland, and has two children.

Edited works

References 
 Stephen Thompson

Citations 

The Onion people
American music journalists
American online publication editors
American magazine editors
American book editors
Living people
1972 births